Disturbing the Peace is a 2009 documentary film directed by the Chinese artist Ai Weiwei. In the movie, Ai Weiwei and Pu Zhiqiang talk to the police and they try to find out what happened to a female colleague after a police raid during their way to Chengdu as the witnesses for the trial of the civil rights advocate Tan Zuoren.

References

External links

2009 films
Chinese documentary films
2009 documentary films
Ai Weiwei